Helanthium bolivianum is a species of plant in the Alismataceae. It is native to southern Mexico, Central America, the West Indies and South America.

References

External links
photo of herbarium specimen, collected in Costa Rica, Helanthium bolivianum

Alismataceae
Flora of Central America
Flora of Mexico
Flora of the Caribbean
Flora of North America
Flora of South America
Aquatic plants
Plants described in 1927
Flora without expected TNC conservation status